Ivy Bannister (born July 11, 1951) is an American-born writer living in Ireland.

The daughter of Richard and Hortense Eberhart, she was born Ivy Eberhart in New York City, grew up in Connecticut and was educated at Smith College and Trinity College in Dublin. In 1976, she married Frank Bannister.

Her poetry and short stories have appeared in various anthologies of Irish writing. Her poems have also appeared in publications such as The Irish Times, the Sunday Tribune, the Poetry Ireland Review and THE SHOp.

Bannister has received the:
 O. Z. Whitehead Award in 1986
 Hennessy Literary Award in 1988
 Listowel Award in 1987
 PJ O'Connor Award in 1991
 Francis MacManus Award in 1999

Selected works 
 The Wilde Circus Show (1990)
 The Magician and other stories (1996)
 The Wall, play, received the Mobil Ireland Playwriting Award in 1993
 The Woman who has Difficulty Answering the Phone (2001)
 Blunt Trauma (2005)
 Vinegar and spit (2008)

References 

1951 births
Living people
20th-century Irish poets
20th-century Irish dramatists and playwrights
Irish women short story writers
20th-century Irish short story writers
Irish women dramatists and playwrights
Irish women poets